Mohammed Al-Yafaee (born October 6, 1984) is an athlete from Yemen. He ran the 800 metres in the 2008 Summer Olympics in Beijing, China, and was the flag-bearer for his nation during the opening ceremonies of those games.

References

External links
 
Sports Reference

1984 births
Living people
Yemeni male middle-distance runners
Athletes (track and field) at the 2008 Summer Olympics
Olympic athletes of Yemen